Moynalvey (Irish: Magh nAilbhe) is a Gaelic Athletic Association club based in the parish of Moynalvey and Kiltale. The parish is located 5 km from Summerhill and 17 km from Dunboyne. Moynalvey parish has a population of approximately 1,700 people. The club grounds are located in Kilmore.

Honours

Meath Intermediate Football Championship (2): 1983, 2011
Meath Junior Football Championship (2): 1981, 2008
Feis Cup (1): 1993

External links
Moynalvey GFC Website
IFC Final 2011

Gaelic games clubs in County Meath
Gaelic football clubs in County Meath